"Shut You Out" is a song by the Swedish punk rock band Millencolin from the album Kingwood. It was released as a single on 24 October 2005, by Burning Heart Records, including the B-side song "Ratboy's Masterplan" from the album's recording sessions. An accompanying music video for "Shut You Out" was also filmed and released, with visual styles based upon the 2005 film Sin City.

Track listing
"Shut You Out"
"Ratboy's Masterplan"

Personnel

Millencolin
Nikola Sarcevic - lead vocals, bass
Erik Ohlsson - guitar
Mathias Färm - guitar
Fredrik Larzon - drums

2005 singles
Millencolin songs
2005 songs
Burning Heart Records singles
Songs written by Nikola Šarčević
Songs written by Mathias Färm
Songs written by Fredrik Larzon
Songs written by Erik Ohlsson (musician)